Plateau Polyvalent de Bouéni is a sports infrastructure located in Bouéni, Mayotte.

History

References 

Buildings and structures in Mayotte
Sports venues in Mayotte